Paolo Borghi (born 27 November 1961) is a retired Italian high jumper.

Biography
He competed at the 1980 Olympic Games, without reaching the final. His personal best jump is 2.28 metres, achieved in May 1980 in Santa Lucia di Piave.

Olympic results

National titles
Paolo Borghi has won one time the individual national championship.
1 win in High jump (1984)

See also
 Men's high jump Italian record progression

References

External links
 

1961 births
Living people
Italian male high jumpers
Athletes (track and field) at the 1980 Summer Olympics
Olympic athletes of Italy